Seoul Station is a major railway station in Seoul, the capital of South Korea. The station is served by the Korail Intercity Lines and the commuter trains of the Seoul Metropolitan Subway.

Services

KTX 
Seoul Station is the terminus of most KTX trains including:

 All trains along the Gyeongbu High Speed Line to Busan, Daejeon, Daegu, Pohang, Masan and Jinju.
 Some trains exclusively Honam High Speed Line and Jeolla lines to GwangjuSongjeong, Mokpo, Suncheon and Yeosu Expo.
 Almost all trains along the Gyeonggang line to  Pyeongchang, Jinbu, Gangneung & Donghae; and
 All KTX trains operating along sections of the conventional Gyeongbu line.

Some KTX services operating along sections of the conventional Honam Line bound for GwangjuSongjeong, Mokpo and Yeosu Expo arrive and depart Yongsan Station.

ITX-Saemaeul 
Seoul Station is the terminus of all ITX-Saemaeul trains along the Gyeongbu and Gyeongjeon Lines to Busan, Daejeon, Daegu, Pohang, Masan and Jinju. ITX-Saemaeul trains on the Honam and Jeolla lines arrive and depart Yongsan Station. ITX-Saemaeul trains to the east of Korea serve Cheongnyangni Station.

Mugunghwa-ho 
Seoul Station is the terminus of all Mugunghwa-ho trains along the Gyeongbu and Gyeongjeon Lines to Busan, Daejeon, Daegu, Pohang, Masan and Jinju; along the and along the Chungbuk Line to Jecheon. Mugunghwa-ho trains on the Honam and Jeolla lines arrive and depart Yongsan Station. Mugunghwa-ho trains to the east of Korea serve Cheongnyangni Station.

Korail Tourist Trains 
Seoul Station is the terminus of a number of Korail's tourist trains, including:

 The DMZ train to Dorasan and Baekmago
 The O-train which loops the centre of the peninsula via Jecheon,  Buncheon and  Cheoram
 The S-train to Yeosu

AREX Airport Railway 
AREX operate two trains from Seoul Station. AREX Express trains run non-stop to Incheon Airport stopping only at Incheon Terminal 1 and Incheon Terminal 2. AREX All-Stop trains are commuter style trains that stop 11 times, including at Seoul's Gimpo Airport.

AREX Express passengers have exclusive access to Seoul Station's City Air Terminal which allows passengers travelling on most Korean airlines from Incheon Airport to check bags and receive boarding passes before boarding the train. Access to the underground Airport Railroad Station and City Air Terminal is either from the central station concourse or via a dedicated drop off area and car park on the west side of the station.

Seoul Subway 
Seoul Subway serves the station with Line 1 and Line 4, and an hourly train on the Gyeongui–Jungang Line.

Around 2015, a large bus transfer center was built in front of the station's main entrance. It has about nine platforms that services different bus routes in Seoul. It is separated from the main roads with a barrier around the platforms. Yet having a rather complicated structure with many bus platforms, the transfer center is built in a simple manner as it is not a separate terminal building.

Station layout

Korail

AREX

↑ Terminus ↑

Gongdeok ↓ / Incheon Int'l Airport Terminal 1 ↓

 Platform numbers are not assigned; instead, platforms are classified as "express" or "local"

Platform layout (AREX)

Seoul Metro

Platform layout (Seoul Metro)

History
The former Seoul station, Namdaemun Station, started operating in a 33 m2 (10 pyeong) wooden building in July 1900 with the extension of the Gyeongin Line north of the Han River. The Gyeongbu Line opened in 1905, and the Gyeongui Line opened in 1921 – both lines connecting to the station. The construction of the current "Old Seoul Station" began on June 1, 1922, and was finished on September 30, 1925. In 1923, the station reverted to the name "Gyeongseong Station," when the name of the city of Seoul changed from Hanseong to Gyeongseong ("Keijo" in Japanese).

The station was renamed "Seoul Station" on November 1, 1947. The station was expanded throughout the post-Korean War era; the Southern Annex of Seoul Station was completed on December 30, 1957, and the Western Annex was completed on February 14, 1969. In 1975, the Korea National Railroad's office moved from Seoul Station to the new West Annex office. A raised walkway connecting the Seoul Station and the West Annex was completed in 1977, and Korea's first privately funded station was erected in 1988 in time for the Seoul Olympics. In 2004, a new terminal adjacent to the existing one was completed to coincide with the introduction of KTX high-speed rail service.

Old Seoul Station

The old Seoul Station (literally meaning "old Seoul Station building"), also known as "Culture Station Seoul 284", originally named Keijo (Gyeongseong) station and designed by Tsukamoto Yasushi of Tokyo Imperial University, was finished in November 1925. This red brick building, designed in an eclectic style, features a Byzantine-style central dome and a centralized and symmetrical layout. The floor of the Central Hall on the ground floor was covered with granite and the walls were covered with man-made stone. The wooden floor inside the building's VIP Lounge was covered with birch wood and a western style restaurant was located on the 2nd floor.

On September 25, 1981, the old station was designated as Historic Site 284. A restoration project of the old station began in September 2007 to "transform the former Seoul Station, which had lost its functionality as a train station since the opening of the new KTX station, into a premier national multidisciplinary cultural facility." On the same year, the management was transferred from the Cultural Heritage Administration to the Ministry of Culture, Sports and Tourism. After the design for former Seoul Station's remodeling was developed in 2009, the remodeling construction began.

On August 9, 2011, the station was reopened as a culture complex with its original exterior, after a two-year restoration project by the Ministry of Culture, Sports and Tourism and the state-run Korea Craft and Design Foundation (KCDF). On April 2, 2012, "Culture Seoul Station 284" was officially launched "as a space for diverse artistic and cultural creation and exchange." The official name, which combines the station's historic, spatial, and urban symbolisms, was selected through a national open call. By combining the notion of a cultural space with the old Seoul Station's historic site number 284, the name aims to embody the concepts of preserving its appearance and value as a historic site while simultaneously cultivating the meaning of the station as a place of various cultural intersections. The restored station is a 9,202m2 building with two stories above ground and one story below ground level. The former station, before the renovation, has the main lobby, a waiting room, and a VIP room on the first floor, and a barber shop and restaurants on the second floor. Post-renovation, the first floor contains a venue for performances, exhibitions and events, and a multipurpose hall on the floor above.

Gallery

See also
Transportation in South Korea

References

External links
 Station information from Korail
 Seoul Station introduction (KTX Cyber Station)
 Seoul Station introduction (Incheon International Airport Railroad Homepage)

Railway stations in Seoul
Railway stations opened in 1925
Seoul Metropolitan Subway stations
Historic Sites of South Korea
Metro stations in Jung District, Seoul
Metro stations in Yongsan District
Korea Train Express stations
1925 establishments in Korea